Juami-Japurá Ecological Station is an ecological station in  the municipality of Japurá, Amazonas, Brazil.

Location

It is administered by the Chico Mendes Institute for Biodiversity Conservation.
It became part of the Central Amazon Ecological Corridor, created in 2002.
The protection unit is located on the right bank of the Japurá River in the municipality of Japurá, Amazonas.
It is only accessible by boat.

Environment

It covers the entire basin of the black water Juami River, which flows into the white water Japurá River.
The highest land is on the edges of the unit, and delimits the river basin.
The conservation unit has a tropical rainforest climate.
The vegetation is Rain Forest Lowland.

Conservation

The Ecological Station is a "strict nature reserve" under IUCN protected area category Ia.
Its purpose is to secure nature and biodiversity and to support scientific research and environmental education.
The conservation unit is supported by the Amazon Region Protected Areas Program.
It preserves a representative sample of the interfluvial region between the Içá River and Japurá River, tributaries of the Solimões River.
The bald uakari (Cacajao calvus rubicundus) is protected in the reserve.
There have been reports of mining activity in the vicinity.
Inspection is difficult due to lack of infrastructure.

References

Sources

1985 establishments in Brazil
Ecological stations of Brazil
Protected areas of Amazonas (Brazilian state)
Protected areas established in 1985